Emerald Nunatak is a nunatak  high on the west side of the Douglas Range near the head of Hampton Glacier in northeast Alexander Island, Antarctica. It was so named by the UK Antarctic Place-Names Committee following surveys by the British Antarctic Survey, 1973–77, because of the greenish rock of which the feature is composed.

See also

 Figaro Nunatak
 Hengist Nunatak
 Lizard Nunatak

References 

Nunataks of Alexander Island